The 1990 Italian Grand Prix (formally the Coca-Cola 61º Gran Premio d'Italia) was a Formula One motor race held at Monza on 9 September 1990. It was the twelfth race of the 1990 Formula One World Championship. The race was the 60th Italian Grand Prix and the 55th to be held at Monza.

The 53-lap race was won by Brazilian driver Ayrton Senna, driving a McLaren-Honda. Senna took pole position, led every lap and set the fastest race lap, thus achieving a Grand Slam. Senna's Driver's Championship rival, Frenchman Alain Prost, finished second in his Ferrari, some six seconds behind, with Senna's Austrian teammate Gerhard Berger third.

The win enabled Senna to extend his lead over Prost in the Drivers' Championship to 16 points with four races remaining.

Qualifying

Pre-qualifying report
The Friday morning pre-qualifying session at Monza followed a similar pattern to the previous race at Spa, with the same four drivers progressing to the main qualifying sessions. Olivier Grouillard was fastest again in the Osella, his tenth pre-qualification from twelve attempts. Bertrand Gachot achieved his best pre-qualifying position of the season so far in second place in the Coloni, his second success at this stage. The AGS cars both pre-qualified again in third and fourth, with Gabriele Tarquini outpacing Yannick Dalmas this time.

Therefore the same three cars missed out on pre-qualification, namely the two EuroBruns and the Life. Fifth again was the EuroBrun of Roberto Moreno, just under six tenths of a second slower than Dalmas, although Claudio Langes was nearly 6.5 seconds further adrift in the sister car. Bruno Giacomelli was 20 seconds further behind in the Life, having only managed two laps at the team's home event before a substantial engine failure. It was the last appearance for their unusual, but hugely underdeveloped W12 engine.

Pre-qualifying classification

Qualifying report

Qualifying classification

Race

Race report
Warwick clambered out of the car unhurt. The race was stopped on the second lap and restarted over the original distance, with Warwick taking the spare car and eventually retiring with a clutch failure. Jean Alesi became the first retirement as he went off Variante del Rettifilo on lap 5 and hit the wall, as the Lotus of Martin Donnelly had a dramatic engine failure at the start of lap 14. And Alboreto in the Arrows spun off at Ascari with only 1 lap to go.

Race classification

Championship standings after the race

Drivers' Championship standings

Constructors' Championship standings

References

Italian Grand Prix
Italian Grand Prix
Grand Prix
Italian Grand Prix